Thomas Ransford (born 1958) is a British-born Canadian mathematician, known for his research in spectral theory and complex analysis. He holds a Canada Research Chair in mathematics at Université Laval.

Ransford earned his Ph.D. from the University of Cambridge in 1984.

Career
He was a fellow of Trinity College, University of Cambridge, from 1983 to 1987.

In addition to over 90 research papers on mathematics, he has written a research monograph "Potential Theory in the Complex Plane" in 1995, and the graduate book "A Primer on the Dirichlet Space" with Omar El-Fallah, Karim Kellay and Javad Mashreghi in 2014 .  

He has proved results on potential theory, functional analysis, the theory of capacity,  and probability. For example, with Javad Mashreghi he proved the Mashreghi–Ransford inequality. He also derived a short elementary proof of Stone–Weierstrass theorem .

References

1958 births
Living people
21st-century Canadian mathematicians
20th-century English mathematicians
Academic staff of Université Laval
Alumni of the University of Cambridge
Fellows of Trinity College, Cambridge
Cambridge mathematicians